V. Bessel and Co. was a musical firm founded in 1869 in St Petersburg by Vasily Vasil’yevich Bessel (1843–1907). His brother N. V. Bessel was a co-owner of the firm.

The firm and a print shop (since 1871) published works by prominent Russian composers, notably Pyotr Tchaikovsky, Anton Rubinstein, Alexander Dargomyzhsky and the members of the New Russian Musical School — Modest Musorgsky, Nikolay Rimsky-Korsakov, César Cui, Mily Balakirev, and Alexander Borodin. 

The firm issued a weekly magazine “Muzykal’ny listok” [The Musical Leaf] from September 3, 1872 to June 5, 1877, and  “Muzykal’noye obozrenie” [The musical revue] (1885–1888).

The firm moved from St Petersburg to Paris after the Russian Revolution 1917.

External links
 Muzykal’ny listok

Bessel
Bessel
Publishing companies established in 1869
1869 establishments in the Russian Empire
Music organizations based in Russia